The list below includes the names of notable password managers with dedicated Wikipedia articles.

Summary information

Features

See also
 Password manager
 Password fatigue
 Comparison of TOTP applications

References

Bibliography
 
 
 

 
Lists of software
Lists of software add-ons
Security software comparisons